Alessandro Scialpi (born 23 February 1992) is an Italian footballer.

Biography
Born in Gallipoli, the Province of Lecce, Apulia, Scialpi started his career at  U.S. Lecce. He left for Serie A club Genoa in a temporary deal in summer 2009, but returned to southern Italy in January 2010. That season he was a player of the reserve teams for both Genoa and Lecce.

Varese
In summer 2010, Scialpi once again moved to northern Italy for A.S. Varese 1910. Lecce gave Varese half of the registration rights for a peppercorn of €500 in order to farm out the player. In January 2012 Scialpi left the reserve team for Carpi. However, he only played once in 2011–12 Lega Pro Prima Divisione. In June 2012 Varese acquired all the registration rights from Lecce.

Como
In July 2012 Scialpi left for another third level club Calcio Como along with Alex Benvenga and Paolo Marchi. He was transferred to Venice in August 2014.

Lega Pro clubs
Scialpi was a player for Venice in 2014–15 Lega Pro. The team was expelled from professional league after the season due to financial difficulties.

On 25 July 2015 Scialpi was signed by Martina. However, he was released on 4 December.

International career
Scialpi capped twice for Italy national under-17 football team in 2009 UEFA European Under-17 Football Championship elite qualification. He was substituted at half time in the first round (by Leonardo Bianchi) and entered the field in the 54th minute of the third round as the replacement of Alberto Libertazzi. Scialpi missed the final tournament in May due to injury as well as a tournament in Saarland in September 2008 and the U17 Euro qualification. Scialpi played 5 times in October at 2009 FIFA U-17 World Cup.

References

External links
 Football.it Profile 
 
 FIGC 

Italian footballers
U.S. Lecce players
S.S.D. Varese Calcio players
A.C. Carpi players
Como 1907 players
Venezia F.C. players
Serie B players
Serie C players
Association football midfielders
People from Gallipoli, Apulia
1992 births
Living people
Sportspeople from the Province of Lecce
21st-century Italian people